Thora Rae (born 15 October 1999) is a field hockey player from Canada.

Personal life
Thora Rae was born and raised in Vancouver, British Columbia. She is a student at the University of British Columbia.

Career

Under–21
Thora Rae debuted for the Canada U–21 team in 2019 during a four–nations tournament in Dublin.

In 2021, Rae appeared in the team again at the Pan American Junior Championship in Santiago. At the tournament, Rae won a gold medal with the team, scoring once and securing qualification to the FIH Junior World Cup.

Senior national team
Rae made her senior international debut in 2016, during a test series against New Zealand in Hamilton.

In 2022 Rae was named to the national squad for the first time. In January, she represented the team at the Pan American Cup in Santiago, where she won a bronze medal.

International goals

References

External links

1999 births
Living people
Canadian female field hockey players
Female field hockey forwards
Field hockey people from British Columbia